Acacia dawsonii, also known as Dawson's wattle or poverty wattle or mitta wattle, is a shrub of the genus Acacia and the subgenus Plurinerves found along parts of the east coast of Australia

Description
Like most species of Acacia it has phyllodes rather than true leaves.
It produces golden yellow flowers that are globular in shape and are found on short racemes from the leaf axils in springtime.

Taxonomy
It was first described in 1897 by Richard Baker.

Distribution
It is native to an area down the east coast from as far north as south east Queensland, New South Wales and north east Victoria in the south. Found in open woodland and forests along the slopes and tableland areas. It is not widely cultivated but is quite hardy and suitable for a wide range of climates.

See also
 List of Acacia species

References

dawsonii
Flora of Victoria (Australia)
Flora of New South Wales
Taxa named by Richard Thomas Baker
Plants described in 1897
Flora of Queensland